Žižki is a village in the Municipality of Črenšovci in the Prekmurje region of northeastern Slovenia.

There is a small chapel-shrine in the settlement dedicated to Saint Florian. It was built in 1936 in a Neo-Gothic style.

References

External links
Žižki on Geopedia
Žižkuska vasica

Populated places in the Municipality of Črenšovci